Unimart may mean:
Uni-Mart, a defunct Pennsylvania-based grocery store
Unimart (California), a defunct California discount store
Unimart (Philippines), a supermarket chain in Metro Manila, Philippines